Khalid Ali bin-Ali al-Hajj (1973 – March 15, 2004), also known as Abu-Hazim al-Sha'ir, was an alleged leader of Al-Qaeda listed on Saudi Arabia's Most Wanted list.

Background
Khalid al-Hajj was a colleague of Osama bin Laden in Afghanistan in 1997. In addition, Khalid al-Hajj replaced Abd al-Rahim al-Nashiri, the mastermind of the USS Cole bombing, as the leader of an Al-Qaeda faction. Khalid al-Hajj was reportedly killed on March 15, 2004, by Saudi Security Forces.

References

1973 births
2004 deaths
Fugitives
Deaths by firearm in Saudi Arabia
Named on Saudi Arabia's list of most wanted suspected terrorists
Saudi Arabian al-Qaeda members